Admiral Sir Bartholomew James Sulivan,  (18 November 1810 – 1 January 1890) was a British naval officer and hydrographer. He was a leading advocate of the value of nautical surveying in relation to naval operations.

Sulivan was born at Mylor, Cornwall, near Falmouth, the son of Rear Admiral Thomas Ball Sulivan.

His early career included service under Robert FitzRoy on the second voyage of HMS Beagle from 1831 to 1836 with Charles Darwin, during which Bartolomé Island in the Galapagos Islands was named after him. From 1842 to 1846 he commanded HMS Philomel on the South American Station and surveyed the Falkland Islands.

He was the commander of the combined Anglo-French fleet at the Battle of Vuelta de Obligado which took place on 20 November 1845.

During the Crimean War he was sent by Sir Francis Beaufort, Hydrographer of the Navy, to the Baltic to assist the fleet commanded by Sir Charles Napier. Sulivan, commanding the paddle steamer HMS Lightning, made many invaluable surveys and charts of the shallow waters in which the fleet had to operate, and led the bombardment ships into position during the capture of Bomarsund. From 1856 to 1865 he was the naval professional member of the Board of Trade. He was promoted to Vice-Admiral in 1870, and Admiral in 1877. After Robert FitzRoy killed himself in 1865, leaving his wife and daughter destitute, Sulivan convinced the British government to provide them with £3000, to which Charles Darwin contributed another £100 of his own money.

He was created a CB in July 1855, and a KCB in the June 1869 Birthday Honours.

The Falkland Islands issued a set of stamps in 1985 for "Early Cartographers maps", the ship Philomel is featured on the fourth in set, 54p stamp along with a portrait of Admiral Sir B. J. Sulivan K.C.B.

References

External links

 
 
 Book Life and letters of the late Admiral Sir Bartholomew James Sulivan, K. C. B., 1810–1890, published in 1896, available online

1810 births
1890 deaths
Royal Navy officers
Royal Navy personnel of the Crimean War
Knights Commander of the Order of the Bath
Royal Navy admirals
English hydrographers
Scientists from Cornwall
People from Flushing, Cornwall
Sailors from Cornwall